Bonsall Unified School District is a school district located in the unincorporated community of Bonsall, California, in San Diego County. There are currently five schools: Sullivan Middle School, Bonsall Elementary, Bonsall West Elementary, Bonsall High School, and Vivian Banks Charter School. Sullivan Middle School and Bonsall High School are located right next to each other. Bonsall High School opened to 9th grade students August 2014 and added a grade level every year for the next three years.

References

External links
 

School districts in San Diego County, California